Neodymium(II) bromide is an inorganic compound of neodymium and bromide.

Preparation 
Neodymium(II) bromide can be obtained via the reduction of neodymium(III) bromide with neodymium in a vacuum at 800 to 900 °C.
Nd + 2 NdBr3 -> 3 NdBr2

Properties 
Neodymium(II) bromide is a dark green solid. The compound is extremely hygroscopic and can only be stored and handled under carefully dried inert gas or under a high vacuum. In air or on contact with water, it converts to hydrates by absorbing moisture, but these are unstable and more or less rapidly transform into oxybromides with evolution of hydrogen. The compound has the same crystal structure as lead(II) chloride type.

References 

Neodymium compounds
Lanthanide halides
Bromides